HIV Tat-specific factor 1 is a protein that in humans is encoded by the HTATSF1 gene.

Function 
Whereas most DNA sequence-specific transcription factors increase the rate of initiation and interact with enhancer or promoter DNA, human immunodeficiency virus-1 (HIV-1) Tat predominantly stimulates elongation and interacts with the trans-acting responsive (TAR) RNA element. Tat is essential for HIV replication.

HTATSF1 has also been shown to be involved in intron retention, and is associated with splicing of mRNAs that encode ribosomal proteins. It is also associated with a naïve pluripotent state, although the relationship is complex and is strongly affected by other pluripotency factors such as Nanog and KLF2.

Interactions
HTATSF1 has been shown to interact with SUPT5H and GTF2F2.

References

Further reading